Accidentally on Purpose may refer to:

 Accidentally on Purpose (TV series), an American sitcom starring Jenna Elfman
 Accidentally on Purpose (Ian Gillan and Roger Glover album), 1988
 Accidentally on Purpose (The Shires album), 2018
 Accidentally on Purpose (song), a song by George Jones
 Accidentally on Purpose, a 2005 short film featuring Joey Diaz
 Accidentally on Purpose, a 1960 autobiography by Michael York
 Accidentally on Purpose: Reflections on Life, Acting and the Nine Natural Laws of Creativity, a book by John Strasberg 
 "Accidentally on Purpose", a poem by Robert Frost published in his 1962 compilation In the Clearing